Vavoua is a city in west-central Ivory Coast. It is a sub-prefecture of and the seat of Vavoua Department in Haut-Sassandra Region, Sassandra-Marahoué District. Vavoua is also a commune. In the 2021 census, its population was 132,528.

In October 2018, the city elected Bonaventure Kalou, the former international Ivorian footballer, as its new mayor.

In 2021, the population of the sub-prefecture of Vavoua was 132,528.

Villages
The 14 villages of the sub-prefecture of Vavoua and their population in 2014 are:

Notes

Sub-prefectures of Haut-Sassandra
Communes of Haut-Sassandra